John Tirman (December 13, 1949 – August 19, 2022) was an American political theorist. From 2004, Tirman was executive director and principal research scientist at the MIT Center for International Studies. There he led the Persian Gulf Initiative, which conducted work on Iraq war mortality and U.S. and Iran relations, as well as other projects. He was the author or coauthor of 13 books on international affairs, many of them exploring and advocating the “human security” paradigm in global affairs, and was a frequent contributor to AlterNet, The Huffington Post, and The Boston Globe.

Education and early career
Tirman was educated at Indiana University (B.A., 1972) and subsequently earned a doctorate at Boston University, where he specialized in political theory with Howard Zinn, Frances Fox Piven, Murray Levin, and Alasdair MacIntyre.  His friendship with Zinn and his wife Roz lasted for nearly 40 years.  Zinn told his biographer Davis Joyce that Tirman was one of his best students.

Tirman worked at Time magazine and the Union of Concerned Scientists (UCS).  It was at UCS where he began to work on international security issues, mentored by Henry W. Kendall, the chair of UCS and a professor of physics at MIT; Kendall later was co-recipient of the Nobel Prize in physics.  Tirman edited two books on "star wars", the strategic defense initiative started by President Ronald Reagan; one of them, The Fallacy of Star Wars (Vintage, 1984), was the first important critique of strategic defense, and brought together leading scientists like Kendall, Hans Bethe, Victor Weisskopf, and Richard Garwin, among others.  Tirman wrote frequently on the issue for the Bulletin of the Atomic Scientists, The Nation, the Los Angeles Times, Esquire, and others.  For 12 years, beginning in 1986, he headed the Winston Foundation for World Peace, a charitable foundation created by Robert Winston Scrivner, which provided grants to NGOs working on nuclear disarmament and conflict prevention.  He also headed the Henry P. Kendall Foundation and the CarEth Foundation in the mid- to late 1990s, and was editor of the peace movement magazine, Nuclear Times.

Academic career
In 1999, Tirman was awarded a Fulbright scholarship to work on conflict resolution in Cyprus.  He produced an educational Web site on the conflict, The Cyprus Conflict.
Returning from Cyprus, Tirman was appointed Program Director at the Social Science Research Council, a leading academic think tank, in New York in 2000.  He headed the Program on Global Security and Cooperation with colleague Itty Abraham.  In 2001 he opened a Washington, D.C. office for SSRC.   
He moved to MIT in 2004.  His work there has mainly focused on U.S. policy in the Persian Gulf. He decried the war in 2002–03 in a series of articles for AlterNet, including one that predicted a few days into the war that it would become bogged down and be viewed as a failure.  In 2005, Tirman commissioned the Iraq Mortality Study that was published in The Lancet in October 2006.  The study, which was controversial at the time because of its high estimates of total “excess deaths” attributable to the war (~650,000), was carried out by scientists at the Johns Hopkins School of Public Health and in Iraq.  Tirman has written frequently on the topic, including articles for The Boston Globe, The Washington Post, The New York Times, AlterNet, and others.  The one independent and peer-reviewed assessment of Iraq mortality estimates, in Conflict and Health (2008), found the Lancet-published survey to be superior to all other methods.
At MIT, Tirman has also undertaken several projects on U.S.-Iran relations, publishing in 2009 a white paper on a “New Approach to Iran” for the New Ideas Fund, excoriating America's militant attitudes toward Iran and urging greater accommodation.   He convened conferences and published on the regional dimension of the Iraq War, the role of terrorism in upsetting diplomatic relations, and the challenges of political instability in the Gulf.  He brought to MIT such Iranian luminaries as President Mohammad Khatami, former deputy foreign minister Abbas Maleki, former reform parliamentarian Fatemeh Haghighatjoo, and dissident Akbar Ganji.

Human Security
After his arms control work in the 1980s, Tirman’s most significant intellectual contributions derive from his work on human security, which places human communities at the center of the security discourse and planning.  In 1997, he published Spoils of War: The Human Cost of America's Arms Trade (Free Press), which demonstrated the human consequences of U.S. arms sales to Turkey to suppress the Kurdish rebellion.  He published on this topic in Boston Review, Boston Globe, The Nation, and The Washington Post.  He was also part of an informal group of activists and intellectuals advising the Clinton administration on Turkey’s human rights record in the late 1990s.

For this work on Kurdish rights, he was given a Human Rights Award by the United Nations Association of Washington, D.C. in 1998.

Tirman has long argued that social movements can and do have important impacts on international security, a view he published in a widely cited and reproduced essay in The Nation, "How We Ended the Cold War."  The argument he made was that the peace movement convinced the American public that the Cold War was dangerous and costly, giving Reagan “permission” to pursue détente with Soviet leader Mikhail Gorbachev.  At SSRC, he explored how structural adjustment policies were a proximate cause of instability and conflict, convening a conference and publishing on the topic, notably in the journal, Development.  He also took up human security topics as they relate to migration; after the 9/11 attacks, he convened a group of scholars to produce the volume, The Maze of Fear: Security and Migration After 9/11 (The New Press, 2004).  In this and in work with Chatham House and others, he provided sharp critiques of the treatment of Muslim immigrants and assailed the excesses of the “war on terrorism.”  In 2009, he co-edited with Susan Martin, Women, Migration and Conflict: Breaking a Deadly Cycle (Springer), the result of an advisory project he convened on behalf of the U.N. Population Fund.

The work on Iraqi casualties is a continuation of the human security focus in Tirman's work.  In 2011, he published The Deaths of Others: The Fate of Civilians in America's Wars (Oxford University Press), which took up civilian suffering as a consequence of U.S. interventions in Korea, Indochina, Afghanistan, and Iraq.  He published several short pieces on the topic, including articles in Alternet, the New York Times, the Washington Spectator, Washington Post, and Boston Review.

Tirman served as board co-chair of the Foundation for National Progress, which publishes Mother Jones magazine; U.S. chair of the Institute for War and Peace Reporting; and trustee of International Alert.

Personal life and death
Tirman died from cardiac arrest on August 19, 2022, at the age of 72.

Books by Tirman (incomplete)
 Dream Chasers: Immigration and the American Backlash 2015 
 The Deaths of Others: The Fate of Civilians in America's Wars 2011 
 100 Ways America Is Screwing Up the World 2006 
 Maze of Fear 2004 
 Making the Money Sing: Private Wealth and Public Power in the Search for Peace 2000 
 Spoils of War: The Human Cost of America's Arms Trade 1997 
 Sovereign Acts: American Unilateralism and Global Security 1989

References

1949 births
2022 deaths
Boston University alumni
Massachusetts Institute of Technology faculty
People from Bluffton, Indiana
Writers from Indiana